Metropol TV was a local TV channel for Oslo, Norway but could be seen in the rest of the country through cable TV. The channel was started in 1999 and ceased broadcasting in February 2002 due to financial difficulties.

Metropol TV cast shows like "En lun aften", promoting comedians Atle Antonsen and Johan Golden.It also had a show called Metropol Live every weekday, with hosts like Sarah Natasha Melbye, Anders Hornslien and others.

Programming
En L.U.N. aften med Golden og Antonsen
Frem fra trengselen
Håvard Lilleheie Show
MAD TV
Banzai
Cracker
Father Ted
WKRP in Cincinnati
Late Show with David Letterman
King of the Hill
Cheers
Metropol Live
Babes in the Wood
The Hunger
Homicide: Life on the Street
An Unsuitable Job For A Woman
City Life
Drop the Beat
Wildside
Picket Fences
The Chief
Men Behaving Badly
The Fast Show
Daria
Beavis and Butt-head
Chicago Sons
Dweebs
Game On
The Tom Green Show
UK Raw
Nigella Bites
Doogie Howser, M.D.
Murder One
Power Play
Spy Game
So Graham Norton

References

Defunct television channels in Norway
Television channels and stations established in 1999
Television channels and stations disestablished in 2002
Mass media in Oslo
1999 establishments in Norway